Ed Peck (March 26, 1917 – September 12, 1992) was an American actor. He is best known as Officer Kirk in Happy Days (1975–1983).

Early life 
Peck was born in New York City on March 26, 1917.

Career 
Peck played a captain in the Broadway production of No Time for Sergeants (1955). He was active in television and in films from 1951 to 1983, specializing in playing either police officers or military officers.

In 1951, Peck replaced Eric Fleming in the title role of Major Dell Conway of the Flying Tigers on the DuMont Television Network. In 1969 Peck appeared as the Hotel Manager on the TV Series The Virginian in the episode titled "Journey to Scathelock."  One of his highest profile parts was among his last, in the television series Happy Days, in the recurring role as police officer Kirk from 1975 to 1983. When he left the series in 1983, he retired from acting. He also played a police officer similar to Officer Kirk in at least one episode of the television series All in the Family and two episodes of Barney Miller as patrolman (later officer) Frank Slater.

Peck was an announcer on The Jack Carson Show, a variety program on NBC-TV in 1953–1954. He also was a member of the cast of the summer 1972 television situation comedy The Super, portraying Officer Clark, a tenant in a New York City apartment building. He also guest-starred on dozens of television series including The Untouchables, Perry Mason, The Fugitive, Kentucky Jones, Get Smart, Star Trek ("Tomorrow Is Yesterday", 1967), Cannon, and Bonanza, as well as films such as Heaven Can Wait, Bullitt, Cheech and Chong's Next Movie, and The Prisoner of Second Avenue. He played the Governor's director of security, Captain McDermott, on several episodes of Benson. He played a rabbi in an episode of The Dick Van Dyke Show.

Personal life 
On January 20, 1952, Peck married advertising copywriter Phyllis Houston in New York.

Death 
Peck died of a heart attack on September 12, 1992, in Los Angeles, California, at the age of 75.

Filmography (partial)

References

External links 

1917 births
1992 deaths
20th-century American male actors
American male film actors
American male television actors
Male actors from New York (state)